This is a comprehensive list of victories of the  cycling team. The races are categorized according to the UCI rules.

Sources:

1998 – La Française des Jeux

 Cyclo-cross Championships, Christophe Mengin
Lutterbach Cyclo-cross, Emmanuel Magnien
Stage 1 Critérium International, Emmanuel Magnien
Stage 5 Tour de Normandie, Franck Perque
Stage 4 GP du Midi-Libre, Damien Nazon
Stage 3 Vuelta Castilla y Leon, Christophe Mengin
Stages 1 & 5 Critérium du Dauphiné, Maximilian Sciandri
Stage 2 Critérium du Dauphiné, Damien Nazon
Coppa Sabatini, Emmanuel Magnien
Polymultipliée Lyonnaise, Emmanuel Magnien
Nouméa Six Days, Jean Michel Tessier

1999 – La Française des Jeux

Stages 3 & 5 Circuit Cycliste Sarthe, Damien Nazon
Stage 4 Quatre Jours de Dunkerque, Jimmy Casper
Amiens Criterium, Jimmy Casper
Villers-Cotterêts, Cyril Saugrain
Stages 1, 3, 4 & 8 Deutschland Tour, Jimmy Casper
Stage 7 Critérium du Dauphiné, Christophe Bassons
Callac Criterium, Stéphane Heulot
Vayrac Criterium, Stéphane Heulot
 Overall Tour du Limousin, Stéphane Heulot
Stage 2, Stéphane Heulot
Stage 1 Tour du Poitou-Charentes et de la Vienne, Jean-Cyril Robin
GP Ouest France, Christophe Mengin
Stages 1 & 5 Trans Canada, Lars Michaelsen
Stages 3 & 10 Tour de l'Avenir, Bradley McGee
Stage 5 Tour de l'Avenir, Damien Nazon
Stage 4 Trans Canada, Jean-Cyril Robin

2000 – La Française des Jeux

GP d'Ouverture, Emmanuel Magnien
Stages 2 & 5 Étoile de Bessèges, Jean-Patrick Nazon
Le Samyn, Frank Høj
Stage 3 Quatre Jours de Dunkerque, Jean-Patrick Nazon
Stage 3a Tour de Picardie, Jean-Patrick Nazon
Stage 16 Giro d'Italia, Fabrizio Guidi
Stage 1 Critérium du Dauphiné, Frédéric Guesdon
Memorial Rik Van Steenbergen, Lars Michaelsen
Stage 2 Tour of Denmark, Lars Michaelsen
Stage 1a Tour de l'Ain, Jean Michel Tessier
Stage 1 Ronde van Nederland, Fabrizio Guidi
Stage 4 Giro della Provincia di Lucca, Fabrizio Guidi
Stage 5a Herald Sun Tour, Bradley McGee

2001 – La Française des Jeux

Stage 3 Tour Méditerranéen, Jimmy Casper
Stage 4 GP du Midi-Libre, Bradley McGee
Stage 5 GP du Midi-Libre, Sven Montgomery
Tartu Rattaralli, Jacky Durand
Tro-Bro Léon, Jacky Durand
Stage 2a Route du Sud, Jimmy Casper
Stage 2b Route du Sud, Bradley McGee
Stage 3 Tour du Poitou-Charentes et de la Vienne, Jimmy Casper
Stage 2 Tour de l'Avenir, Jean-Patrick Nazon
Paris–Brussel, Emmanuel Magnien
U23 Paris–Tours, Samuel Dumoulin
Aixe-sur-Vienne Cyclo-cross, Emmanuel Magnien
Tours Cyclo-cross, Emmanuel Magnien

2002 – La Française des Jeux

Stage 2 Tour of Qatar, Jean-Patrick Nazon
Cholet-Pays de Loire, Jimmy Casper
Dwars door Vlaanderen, Baden Cooke
Stage 1 Critérium International, Jean-Patrick Nazon
Stage 1 GP du Midi-Libre, Baden Cooke
Prologue Critérium du Dauphiné, Bradley McGee
Stage 1 Critérium du Dauphiné, Jacky Durand
Stage 5 Critérium du Dauphiné, Frédéric Guesdon
 National Road Race Championship, Nicolas Vogondy
Stage 7 Tour de France, Bradley McGee
Commonwealth Games Track Championships (Individual pursuit), Bradley McGee
Bol d'Or des Monédières, Nicolas Vogondy
Stage 4 Surrey League 5 Days, Bradley Wiggins
Stage 3 Tour de l'Avenir, Matthew Wilson
Stage 1 U23 Triptyque des Barrages, Philippe Gilbert
Stage 9 Tour de l'Avenir, Jimmy Casper
Kampioenschap van Vlaanderen, Jimmy Casper
Saran Criterium, Nicolas Vogondy
Stage 4 Circuit Franco-Belge, Sandy Casar
 Overall Paris–Corrèze, Baden Cooke
Stage 1, Baden Cooke
 Overall Herald Sun Tour, Baden Cooke
Stages 2 & 4, Baden Cooke
Stage 10, Matthew Wilson
Tours Cyclo-cross, Sandy Casar

2003 – FDJeux.com

Glenvale Crescent Criterium, Baden Cooke
Stages 1 & 4 Tour Down Under, Baden Cooke
Stage 3 Tour Méditerranéen, Baden Cooke
Stage 3a Giro Della Liguria, Jimmy Casper
Stage 1 Driedaagse van West-Vlaanderen, Jimmy Casper
Stage 1 GP Erik Breukink, Jimmy Casper
Stage 2 GP Erik Breukink, Bernhard Eisel
Cholet-Pays de Loire, Christophe Mengin
Stage 1 Circuit Cycliste Sarthe, Carlos Da Cruz
Stage 4 Tour de Suisse, Sandy Casar
Stage 8 Tour de Suisse, Bradley McGee
Stage 9 Tour de Suisse, Baden Cooke
 Points classification Tour de France, Baden Cooke
Prologue, Bradley McGee
Stage 2, Baden Cooke
Profronde van Wateringen, Baden Cooke
Lamballe, Jean-Cyril Robin
Stage 3 Tour du Limousin, Nicolas Vogondy
Stage 4 Tour du Limousin, Bernhard Eisel 
Stage 6 Ronde van Nederland, Bradley McGee
Saint-Eutrope – Quimper, Nicolas Fritsch
Stage 1 Tour de l'Avenir, Bradley Wiggins
Stage 9 Tour de l'Avenir, Philippe Gilbert
GP de Fourmies, Baden Cooke
Kampioenschap van Vlaanderen, Baden Cooke
Stage 3 Paris – Corrèze, Nicolas Fritsch
St Kilda Criterium, Matthew Wilson
Ghent Six Days, Bradley Wiggins
Bridel Cyclo-cross, Philippe Gilbert

2004 – FDJeux.com

 Road Race Championships, Matthew Wilson
Stage 3 Tour Down Under, Philippe Gilbert
Stage 6 Tour Down Under, Baden Cooke
Grand Prix d'Ouverture La Marseillaise, Baden Cooke
Stages 1 & 3 Tour Méditerranéen, Baden Cooke
Stage 3 Critérium des Espoirs, Bernhard Eisel
Stage 2 Driedaagse van De Panne, Baden Cooke
 Overall Circuit de la Sarthe, Thomas Löfkvist
Stage 4, Thomas Löfkvist
Prologue Tour de Romandie, Bradley McGee
Prologue Giro d'Italia, Bradley McGee
 Overall Route du Sud, Bradley McGee
Stage 2, Francis Mourey
Stage 3, Bradley McGee
 Time Trial Championships, Thomas Löfkvist
Stage 5 Regio-Tour, Nicolas Vogondy
Stage 2 Tour du Poitou Charentes, Sandy Casar
Stage 10 Tour de l'Avenir, Thomas Löfkvist
Overall Paris–Corrèze, Philippe Gilbert
Stages 2, 3 & 5 Herald Sun Tour, Baden Cooke

2005 – La Française des Jeux

 Overall Étoile de Bessèges, Freddy Bichot
Stage 1, Freddy Bichot
Stage 2 Tour Méditerranéen, Philippe Gilbert
Stage 4 GP Costa Azul, Bernhard Eisel
Stages 1 & 4 Volta ao Algarve, Bernhard Eisel
Tour du Haut Var, Philippe Gilbert
Trophée des Grimpeurs, Philippe Gilbert
Stage 2 Four Days of Dunkirk, Philippe Gilbert
GP de Villers-Cotterêts, Bradley McGee
Stage 1 Tour de Suisse, Bernhard Eisel
Stage 3 Tour de Suisse, Bradley McGee
 Overall Route du Sud, Sandy Casar
 Road Race Championships, Jussi Veikkanen
Polynormande, Philippe Gilbert
Overall Paris–Corrèze, Frédéric Finot
Stage 3, Frédéric Finot
Stage 1 Tour de Pologne, Baden Cooke
Stages 4 & 5 Herald Sun Tour, Baden Cooke

2006 – La Française des Jeux

 Overall La Tropicale Amissa Bongo, Jussi Veikkanen
Prologue, Frédéric Guesdon
Stage 1, Jussi Veikkanen
Stage 2, Lilian Jégou
Stage 4 Tour of Qatar, Bernhard Eisel
Stage 3 Étoile de Bessèges, Eric Leblacher
Stage 5 Tour Méditerranéen, Mathieu Ladagnous
Stage 2 Volta ao Algarve, Bernhard Eisel
Omloop Het Volk, Philippe Gilbert
Stage 2 Driedaagse van De Panne, Bernhard Eisel
Stage 2 Critérium du Dauphiné Libéré, Philippe Gilbert
 Time Trial Championships, Gustav Larsson
 Road Race Championships, Thomas Löfkvist
 Road Race Championships, Jussi Veikkanen
Stage 7 Eneco Tour, Philippe Gilbert
Stage 2 Tour du Poitou-Charentes, Jussi Veikkanen
Stage 1 Tour de l'Avenir, Mickaël Delage
Stage 8 Tour de l'Avenir, Rémy Di Gregorio
Grand Prix de Fourmies, Philippe Gilbert
Grand Prix de Wallonie, Philippe Gilbert
Paris–Tours, Frédéric Guesdon

2007 – La Française des Jeux

 Overall La Tropicale Amissa Bongo, Frédéric Guesdon
Stage 4, Lilian Jégou
Stage 4 Étoile de Bessèges, Christophe Mengin
Stage 5 Étoile de Bessèges, Sébastien Chavanel
Stage 3 Critérium International, Thomas Löfkvist
Paris–Camembert, Sébastien Joly
Grand Prix de Denain, Sébastien Chavanel
 Overall Four Days of Dunkirk, Mathieu Ladagnous
Stage 5, Mathieu Ladagnous
Stage 3 Tour de Picardie, Sébastien Chavanel
 Time Trial Championships, Benoît Vaugrenard
Stage 18 Tour de France, Sandy Casar
Polynormande, Benoît Vaugrenard
Stage 1 Tour du Limousin, Philippe Gilbert
Stage 3 Tour du Limousin, Lilian Jégou
Stage 3 Tour du Poitou-Charentes, Sébastien Chavanel
Stage 5 Tour du Poitou-Charentes, Jean-Eudes Demaret

2008 – La Française des Jeux

 Overall La Tropicale Amissa Bongo, Lilian Jégou
Trofeo Mallorca, Philippe Gilbert
Trofeo Soller, Philippe Gilbert
Omloop Het Volk, Philippe Gilbert
Le Samyn, Philippe Gilbert
Stage 2 Driedaagse van West-Vlaanderen, Yauheni Hutarovich
Tro-Bro Léon, Frédéric Guesdon
 Overall Tour de Picardie, Sébastien Chavanel
Stage 4, Sébastien Chavanel
Stage 4 Route du Sud, Jussi Veikkanen
 Road Race Championships, Yauheni Hutarovich
 Finland, Road Race Championships, Jussi Veikkanen
Stage 4 Tour de Wallonie, Gianni Meersman
Polynormande, Arnaud Gérard
Stages 2 & 4 Vuelta a Burgos, Yauheni Hutarovich
Stage 4 Tour du Limousin, Benoît Vaugrenard
Stage 6 Deutschland Tour, Jussi Veikkanen
 Overall Tour du Poitou-Charentes, Benoît Vaugrenard
Stage 3, Benoît Vaugrenard
Paris–Tours, Philippe Gilbert

2009 – La Française des Jeux

 Overall La Tropicale Amissa Bongo, Mathieu Ladagnous
Stage 1, Mathieu Ladagnous
Stage 6, Yauheni Hutarovich
Stages 1 & 5 Tour Méditerranéen, Yauheni Hutarovich
Stage 5 Paris–Nice, Jérémy Roy
Brabantse Pijl, Anthony Geslin
Route Adélie de Vitré, Jérôme Coppel
Stage 4 Circuit de la Sarthe, Anthony Roux
Stage 4 Tour de Picardie, Yoann Offredo
Stage 2 Circuit de Lorraine, Yauheni Hutarovich
Stage 5 Circuit de Lorraine, Sébastien Joly
 Road Race Championships, Yauheni Hutarovich
Stage 16 Tour de France, Sandy Casar
Polynormande, Mathieu Ladagnous
Stage 2 Paris–Corrèze, Wesley Sulzberger
Stage 17 Vuelta a España, Anthony Roux
GP de la Somme, Yauheni Hutarovich
Grand Prix d'Isbergues, Benoît Vaugrenard

2010 – La Française des Jeux / FDJ 

Stage 1 & 3 Tour Méditerranéen, Yauheni Hutarovich
Stage 2 Tour Méditerranéen, Jussi Veikkanen
Stage 1 Volta ao Algarve, Benoît Vaugrenard
 Overall Tour du Haut Var, Christophe Le Mével
Stage 2, Christophe Le Mével
Tro-Bro Léon, Jérémy Roy
Stage 5 Four Days of Dunkirk, Benoît Vaugrenard
Stage 1 Circuit de Lorraine, Yauheni Hutarovich
Stage 5 Circuit de Lorraine, Anthony Roux
Grand Prix de Plumelec-Morbihan, Wesley Sulzberger
 Finland, Road Race Championships, Jussi Veikkanen
Stage 9 Tour de France, Sandy Casar
Stage 3 Tour de Pologne, Yauheni Hutarovich
Stage 2 Paris–Corrèze, Arthur Vichot
Stage 1 Tour du Poitou Charentes et de la Vienne, Anthony Roux
Stage 2 Vuelta a España, Yauheni Hutarovich

2011 – FDJ 

Stage 1 La Tropicale Amissa Bongo, Geoffrey Soupe
Stage 3 La Tropicale Amissa Bongo, Nacer Bouhanni
Grand Prix d'Ouverture La Marseillaise, Jérémy Roy
Stage 1 Étoile de Bessèges, Yauheni Hutarovich
Boucles du Sud Ardèche, Arthur Vichot
 Overall Circuit de la Sarthe, Anthony Roux
Stage 4, Anthony Roux
Overall Circuit des Ardennes, Gianni Meersman
Stage 2, Gianni Meersman
Paris–Camembert, Sandy Casar
Overall Circuit de Lorraine, Anthony Roux
Stages 1 & 4, Anthony Roux
Stage 1 Tour de Wallonie, Mathieu Ladagnous
 Overall Tour Alsace, Thibaut Pinot
Stage 1, Geoffrey Soupe
Stage 5, Thibaut Pinot
Stages 2 & 4 Tour de l'Ain, Thibaut Pinot
Coppa Bernocchi, Yauheni Hutarovich
Stages 3 & 4 Tour du Limousin, Mathieu Ladagnous
Stage 2 Tour du Poitou-Charentes, Yauheni Hutarovich
 Overall Settimana Lombarda, Thibaut Pinot
Stage 1, Thibaut Pinot
Tour du Doubs, Arthur Vichot
GP de la Somme, Anthony Roux
Nationale Sluitingsprijs, Yauheni Hutarovich

2012 – FDJ–BigMat

 Road Race Championships, Yauheni Hutarovich
 Road Race Championships, Nacer Bouhanni
Stage 1 Étoile de Bessèges, Nacer Bouhanni
Stage 6 Tour of Qatar, Arnaud Démare
Les Boucles du Sud Ardèche, Rémi Pauriol
Le Samyn, Arnaud Démare
Stage 2 Driedaagse van West-Vlaanderen, Arnaud Démare
Cholet-Pays de Loire, Arnaud Démare
Stage 3 Critérium International, Pierrick Fédrigo
Overall Circuit de Lorraine, Nacer Bouhanni
Stage 1, Nacer Bouhanni
Stage 5 Critérium du Dauphiné, Arthur Vichot
Stage 2 Route du Sud, Arnaud Démare
Halle–Ingooigem, Nacer Bouhanni
Stage 8 Tour de France, Thibaut Pinot
Stage 15 Tour de France, Pierrick Fédrigo
Stage 1 Tour de Wallonie, Nacer Bouhanni
Stage 2 Paris–Corrèze, Kenny Elissonde
Stages 1 & 2a Tour de l'Ain, Yauheni Hutarovich
Stage 5 Tour de l'Ain, Thibaut Pinot
Stage 4 Tour du Limousin, Jérémy Roy
Vattenfall Cyclassics, Arnaud Démare
Stage 4 Tour de l'Eurometropole, Nacer Bouhanni

2013 – FDJ / FDJ.fr

 Cyclo-Cross Championships, Francis Mourey
Stage 6 (ITT) Étoile de Bessèges, Anthony Roux
Stage 6 Tour of Oman, Nacer Bouhanni
 Overall Tour du Haut Var, Arthur Vichot
Stage 1 Paris–Nice, Nacer Bouhanni
 Road Race Championships, Jussi Veikkanen
Val d'Ille U Classic 35, Nacer Bouhanni
Stage 2 Circuit de la Sarthe, Nacer Bouhanni
Paris–Camembert, Pierrick Fédrigo
Grand Prix de Denain, Arnaud Démare
Tro-Bro Léon, Francis Mourey
La Roue Tourangelle, Mickaël Delage
 Overall Four Days of Dunkirk, Arnaud Démare
Stages 1, 2 & 3, Arnaud Démare
Boucles de l'Aulne, Mathieu Ladagnous
Stage 4 Tour de Suisse, Arnaud Démare
 Road Race Championships, Arthur Vichot
RideLondon-Surrey Classic, Arnaud Démare
Stage 4 Vuelta a Burgos, Anthony Roux
Stage 2 Eneco Tour, Arnaud Démare
Stage 3 Tour du Limousin, Mathieu Ladagnous
Stages 1, 2 & 3 Tour du Poitou-Charentes, Nacer Bouhanni
Grand Prix de Fourmies, Nacer Bouhanni
Stage 15 Vuelta a España, Alexandre Geniez
Stage 20 Vuelta a España, Kenny Elissonde
Grand Prix d'Isbergues, Arnaud Démare
Tour de Vendée, Nacer Bouhanni
Stages 2 & 3 Tour of Beijing, Nacer Bouhanni

2014 – FDJ.fr

 Cyclo-Cross Championships, Francis Mourey
Stage 2 Étoile de Bessèges, Nacer Bouhanni
Stage 6 Tour of Qatar, Arnaud Démare
Stage 1 Paris–Nice, Nacer Bouhanni
Stage 8 Paris–Nice, Arthur Vichot
Stage 1 Critérium International, Nacer Bouhanni
Stage 1 Circuit de la Sarthe, Nacer Bouhanni
Grand Prix de Denain, Nacer Bouhanni
 Overall Four Days of Dunkirk, Arnaud Démare
Stages 1 & 2, Arnaud Démare
 Points classification Giro d'Italia, Nacer Bouhanni
Stages 4, 7 & 10, Nacer Bouhanni
 Overall Tour de Picardie, Arnaud Démare
Stages 2 & 3, Arnaud Démare
Halle–Ingooigem, Arnaud Démare
 Road Race Championships, Jussi Veikkanen
 Road Race Championships, Arnaud Démare
 Young rider classification Tour de France, Thibaut Pinot
Stage 4 Eneco Tour, Nacer Bouhanni
Stages 2 & 8 Vuelta a España, Nacer Bouhanni
Kampioenschap van Vlaanderen, Arnaud Démare
Grand Prix d'Isbergues, Arnaud Démare
 Overall Tour de l'Eurométropole, Arnaud Démare
Stages 1, 2 & 4, Arnaud Démare

2015 – FDJ 

Stage 2a Circuit de la Sarthe, Anthony Roux
La Roue Tourangelle, Lorrenzo Manzin
Tro-Bro Léon, Alexandre Geniez
Stage 5 Tour de Romandie, Thibaut Pinot
Stages 2 & 3 Baloise Belgium Tour, Arnaud Démare
Prologue Boucles de la Mayenne, Johan Le Bon
Stage 5 Tour de Suisse, Thibaut Pinot
Stage 20 Tour de France, Thibaut Pinot
Stage 5 Eneco Tour, Johan Le Bon
 Overall Tour de l'Ain, Alexandre Geniez
Stage 3, Alexandre Geniez
Stage 3 Tour du Poitou-Charentes, Marc Sarreau
 Overall Tour du Gévaudan Languedoc-Roussillon, Thibaut Pinot
Stage 1, Thibaut Pinot

2016 – FDJ

Stage 1 La Méditerranéenne (TTT)
Stage 2 La Méditerranéenne, Arnaud Démare
 Overall Tour du Haut Var, Arthur Vichot
Stage 2, Arthur Vichot
Stage 1 Paris–Nice, Arnaud Démare
Milan–San Remo, Arnaud Démare
 Overall Critérium International, Thibaut Pinot
Stages 2 (ITT) & 3, Thibaut Pinot
Stage 6 Critérium du Dauphiné, Thibaut Pinot
 Overall Circuit de la Sarthe, Marc Fournier
Stage 1, Marc Fournier
Stage 3 (ITT) Tour de Romandie, Thibaut Pinot
Stage 6 Critérium du Dauphiné, Thibaut Pinot
Stage 5 Route du Sud, Arnaud Démare
 Time Trial Championships, Thibaut Pinot
 Time Trial Championships, Ignatas Konovalovas
 Road Race Championships, Arthur Vichot
Stage 4 Tour de l'Ain, Alexandre Geniez
Stage 3 Vuelta a España, Alexandre Geniez
Binche–Chimay–Binche, Arnaud Démare

2017 – FDJ

Grand Prix d'Ouverture La Marseillaise, Arthur Vichot
Stages 1 & 4 Étoile de Bessèges, Arnaud Démare
Stage 2 Vuelta a Andalucía, Thibaut Pinot
 Overall Tour du Haut Var, Arthur Vichot
Stage 1 Paris–Nice, Arnaud Démare
Stage 1 Volta a Catalunya, Davide Cimolai
Grand Prix de Denain, Arnaud Démare
Stage 5 Tour of the Alps, Thibaut Pinot
Stage 2 Four Days of Dunkirk, Arnaud Démare
Stage 5 Four Days of Dunkirk, Ignatas Konovalovas
Stage 20 Giro d'Italia, Thibaut Pinot
Boucles de l'Aulne, Odd Christian Eiking
Prologue & Stage 1 Boucles de la Mayenne, Johan Le Bon
Stage 2 Critérium du Dauphiné, Arnaud Démare
Halle–Ingooigem, Arnaud Démare
 Time Trial Championships, Tobias Ludvigsson
 Time Trial Championships, Ignatas Konovalovas
 Road Race Championships, Arnaud Démare
 Road Race Championships, Ignatas Konovalovas
Stage 4 Tour de France, Arnaud Démare
 Overall Tour de l'Ain, Thibaut Pinot
Prologue, Johan Le Bon
Stage 3, David Gaudu

2018 – FDJ / Groupama–FDJ

Stages 1 & 3 Étoile de Bessèges, Marc Sarreau
Stage 1 Paris–Nice, Arnaud Démare
Stage 6 Paris–Nice, Rudy Molard
La Roue Tourangelle, Marc Sarreau
Stage 2 Circuit Cycliste Sarthe – Pays de la Loire, Marc Sarreau
 Overall Tour of the Alps, Thibaut Pinot
Stage 1 4 Jours de Dunkerque, Marc Sarreau
Stage 6 4 Jours de Dunkerque, Olivier Le Gac
Overall Tour de l'Ain, Arthur Vichot
Stage 3, Arthur Vichot
Stage 8 Tour de Suisse, Arnaud Démare
Stage 4 Route d'Occitanie, Anthony Roux
 Time Trial Championships, Tobias Ludvigsson
 Road Race Championships, Antoine Duchesne
 Time Trial Championships, Georg Preidler
 Road Race Championships, Steve Morabito
 Road Race Championships, Anthony Roux
Paris-Chauny, Ramon Sinkeldam
Stage 18 Tour de France, Arnaud Démare
Stage 6 Tour de Pologne, Georg Preidler
Stage 1 Tour du Limousin, Anthony Roux
 Overall Tour Poitou-Charentes en Nouvelle Aquitaine, Arnaud Démare
Stages 1, 2, 3, 4 (ITT) & 5, Arnaud Démare
 U23 Time Trial Championships, Alexys Brunel
Stages 15 & 19 Vuelta a España, Thibaut Pinot
Paris–Bourges, Valentin Madouas
Milano–Torino, Thibaut Pinot
Il Lombardia, Thibaut Pinot

2019 – Groupama–FDJ

Stage 3 Étoile de Bessèges, Marc Sarreau
Stage 3 (ITT) Volta ao Algarve, Stefan Küng
 Overall Tour du Haut Var, Thibaut Pinot
Stage 3, Thibaut Pinot
Cholet–Pays de la Loire, Marc Sarreau
Route Adélie de Vitré, Marc Sarreau
Stage 2 Tour de Romandie, Stefan Küng
Stage 3 Tour de Romandie, David Gaudu
Stage 10 Giro d'Italia, Arnaud Démare
 Overall Tour de l'Ain, Thibaut Pinot
Stage 3, Thibaut Pinot
Stage 2 Route d'Occitanie, Arnaud Démare
 National Time Trial Championships, Benjamin Thomas
 National U23 Time Trial Championships, Kevin Geniets
 National Time Trial Championships, Stefan Küng
 National Road Race Championships, Sébastien Reichenbach
Stage 14 Tour de France, Thibaut Pinot
Stage 4 Tour de Wallonie, Arnaud Démare
 National Time Trial Championships, Tobias Ludvigsson
Tour du Doubs, Stefan Küng
Stage 1b (ITT) Okolo Slovenska, Stefan Küng
Stage 3 Okolo Slovenska, Arnaud Démare
Tour de Vendée, Marc Sarreau
Paris–Bourges, Marc Sarreau

2020 – Groupama–FDJ 

Stage 1 Étoile de Bessèges, Alexys Brunel
 National Time Trial Championships, Stefan Küng
Milano–Torino, Arnaud Démare
 Overall Tour de Wallonie, Arnaud Démare
Stages 2 & 4 
 National Road Race Championships, Arnaud Démare
 National Road Race Championships, Kevin Geniets
 UEC European Time Trial Championships, Stefan Küng
 Overall Tour Poitou-Charentes en Nouvelle-Aquitaine, Arnaud Démare
Stages 1, 2 & 4 
Stage 2 Tour de Luxembourg, Arnaud Démare
 Points classification, Giro d'Italia, Arnaud Démare
Stages 4, 6, 7 & 11, Arnaud Démare
 National Road Race Championships, Stefan Küng
Stages 11 & 18 Vuelta a España, David Gaudu

2021 – Groupama–FDJ 

Classic Sud-Ardèche, David Gaudu
La Roue Tourangelle, Arnaud Démare
Stage 6 Tour of the Basque Country, David Gaudu
 Overall Volta a la Comunitat Valenciana, Stefan Küng
Stage 1, Miles Scotson
Stages 2 & 5, Arnaud Démare
Stage 4 (ITT), Stefan Küng
 Overall Boucles de la Mayenne, Arnaud Démare
Stages 2, 3 & 4, Arnaud Démare
Stage 1 (ITT) Tour de Suisse, Stefan Küng
Stage 2 Route d'Occitanie, Arnaud Démare
 National Time Trial Championships, Stefan Küng
 National Time Trial Championships, Benjamin Thomas
 National Time Trial Championships, Kevin Geniets
 National Road Race Championships, Kevin Geniets
 National Road Race Championships, Ignatas Konovalovas
Polynormande, Valentin Madouas
 UEC European Time Trial Championships, Stefan Küng
Stage 5 Tour de Luxembourg, David Gaudu
Paris–Tours, Arnaud Démare
Chrono des Nations, Stefan Küng

2022 – Groupama–FDJ 

Stage 2 Volta ao Algarve, David Gaudu
Stage 5 Tour of the Alps, Thibaut Pinot
 Points classification, Giro d'Italia, Arnaud Démare
Stages 5, 6 & 13, Arnaud Démare
Stage 3 Critérium du Dauphiné, David Gaudu
Stage 1 Route d'Occitanie, Arnaud Démare
Stage 7 Tour de Suisse, Thibaut Pinot
 National Time Trial Championships, Bruno Armirail
 National Road Race Championships, Attila Valter
Stage 7 Tour de Pologne, Arnaud Démare
Stage 1 Tour de l'Ain, Jake Stewart
 Overall Tour Poitou-Charentes en Nouvelle Aquitaine, Stefan Küng
Stage 4 (ITT), Stefan Küng
Tour du Doubs, Valentin Madouas
Stages 1 & 5 Tour de Luxembourg, Valentin Madouas
Grand Prix d'Isbergues, Arnaud Démare
Paris–Tours, Arnaud Démare
Chrono des Nations, Stefan Küng

2023 – Groupama–FDJ 

Stage 5 (ITT) Volta ao Algarve, Stefan Küng
Cholet-Pays de la Loire, Laurence Pithie

Supplementary statistics
Sources

1997 to 2017

2018 to present

References

FDJ
Groupama–FDJ